Isla San Marcos Airstrip  is a private-use dirt airstrip located on the South coast of Isla San Marcos, Baja California Sur, Mexico, an island located in the Gulf of California.

It is located 10 miles southeast of Santa Rosalía, Municipality of Mulegé.

The airstrip is handled by "Compañía Occidental Mexicana S.A de C.V.", a mining company that exploits the gypsum deposits that exist on the island.

The airstrip  handles national air traffic for the town of San Marcos, the community where the mining company workers and their families live. The airstrip is private-use only, so permission is needed before landing.

External links
Compañía Occidental Mexican Official Page
Isla San Marcos Info

Airports in Baja California Sur
Mulegé Municipality